
Słupsk County is a unit of territorial administration and local government (powiat) in Pomeranian Voivodeship, northern Poland, on the Baltic coast. It came into being on 1 January 1999, as a result of the Polish local government reforms passed in 1998. Its administrative seat is the city of Słupsk, although the city is not part of the county (it constitutes a separate city county).

As of 2019 its total population is 98,793, out of which the population of Ustka is 15,460, that of Kępice is 3,580, and the rural population is 79,753.

Słupsk County on a map of the counties of Pomeranian Voivodeship

Apart from the city of Słupsk, Słupsk County is also bordered by Lębork County to the east, Bytów County to the south-east, and Koszalin County and Sławno County to the west. It also borders the Baltic Sea to the north.

Administrative division
The county is subdivided into 10 gminas (one urban, one urban-rural and eight rural). These are listed in the following table, in descending order of population.

References

 
Land counties of Pomeranian Voivodeship